Hancock Park is a neighborhood in the Wilshire area of Los Angeles, California. Developed in the 1920s, the neighborhood features architecturally distinctive residences, many of which were constructed in the early 20th century. Hancock Park is covered by a Historic Preservation Overlay Zone (HPOZ).

History
Hancock Park was developed in the 1920s by the Hancock family with profits earned from oil drilling in the former Rancho La Brea. The area owes its name to developer-philanthropist George Allan Hancock, who subdivided the property in the 1920s. Hancock, born and raised in a home at what is now the La Brea tar pits, inherited , which his father, Major Henry Hancock had acquired from the Rancho La Brea property owned by the family of Jose Jorge Rocha.

in 1948 Nat King Cole and his family purchased a $65,000 Tudor mansion in Hancock Park, becoming the first African American family to do so.  But this started a series of protests, where the Hancock Park Property Owners Association tried, but failed, to prevent him from buying the house. The association then tried to buy the house from him. What followed was months of abuse, in which his dog was poisoned and racial insults burnt into his lawn. In an unpublished covenant for the property it showed that the home was for whites only and not for "any person whose blood is not entirely that of the Caucasian race", with the exception that "persons not of the Caucasian race" who could reside in "the capacity of servants". An attorney for property owners in the area said, “We don’t want undesirable people coming here”. Cole replied, “Neither do I, and if I see anybody undesirable coming into this neighborhood, I’ll be the first to complain”.

Hancock Park activists were instrumental in the passage of a 1986 Congressional ban on tunneling through the neighborhood. The ban, sponsored by Congressman Henry Waxman, prevented the Red Line Subway from being routed along Wilshire Boulevard through the neighborhood.

Geography

Hancock Park's boundaries, as defined by the Mapping L.A. project of the Los Angeles Times, are Wilshire Boulevard on the south, Melrose Avenue on the north, La Brea Avenue on the west, and both sides of North and South Arden Boulevard on the east. Neighboring communities are central Hollywood to the northeast, Melrose to the northwest, Citrus Square and La Brea–Hancock to the west, Brookside to the southwest, Fremont Place to the southeast, and Larchmont and Windsor Square to the east.

The Hancock Park homeowners association counts about 1,200 homes within a smaller defined area within the boundaries of Melrose Avenue, Wilshire Boulevard, and both sides of Highland and Rossmore avenues. The Hancock Park Homeowners Association has tried to get the Times to change its boundaries.

The neighborhood surrounds the grounds of the Wilshire Country Club.

Historic Preservation Overlay Zone

The Hancock Park HPOZ was adopted by City Council in 2008. The area is "generally bounded by Melrose Avenue on the north, Highland Avenue on the west, Rossmore Avenue on the east, and the rear property lines of the commercial properties along Wilshire Boulevard on the south". HPOZ signage is posted in the neighborhood.

It is largely within the Wilshire Community Plan area, though a small portion in the northwest (north of Rosewood Avenue and west of June Street) is in the Hollywood Community Plan area.

Historic Cultural Monuments

The following Historic-Cultural Monuments are located in Hancock Park:
 Queen and Washingtonia Robusta Palm Trees and Median Strip - Palm trees planted in 1928. Historic Cultural Monument 94, designated January 26, 1972.
 La Casa de las Campanas - 350–354 N. June Street.  Historic Cultural Monument 239, designated April 9, 1981.
 The El Royale - An apartment building built in 1929. Historic Cultural Monument 309, designated September 2, 1986.
 Wolff-Fifield House - 111 N. June Street. Historic Cultural Monument 619, designated June 21, 1996.
 The Ravenswood - An apartment building built in 1930. Historic Cultural Monument 768, designated November 7, 2003.

Demographics
The following data applies to the boundaries set by Mapping L.A.:

The 2000 U.S. census counted 9,804 residents in the 1.59-square-mile neighborhood—an average of 6,459 people per square mile, including the expanse of the Wilshire Country Club. That figure gave Hancock Park one of the lowest densities in Los Angeles. In 2008, the city estimated that the population had increased to 10,671. The median age for residents was 37, considered old when compared with the city as a whole; the percentages of residents aged 35 and above were among the county's highest.

Hancock Park was moderately diverse ethnically. The population was 70.7% non-Hispanic White, 13.1% Asian, 8.5% Hispanic or Latino, 3.8% Black, and 3.9% were of other or mixed race. Korea and the Philippines were the most common places of birth for the 26.3% of the residents who were born abroad, a figure that was considered low compared to rest of the city.

The median yearly household income in 2008 dollars was $85,277, a relatively high figure for Los Angeles, and a high percentage of households earned $125,000 or more. The average household size of 2.1 people was low for the city of Los Angeles. Renters occupied 52.7% of the housing units, and house- or apartment owners 47.3%.

The percentages of never-married men and women, 41.3% and 34.4%, respectively, were among the county's highest. The 2000 census found 203 families headed by single parents, a low rate for both the city and the county. The percentage of military veterans who served during World War II or Korea was among the county's highest.

Hancock Park residents were considered highly educated, 56.2% of those aged 25 and older having earned a four-year degree. The percentage of residents with a master's degree was high for the county.

Orthodox Jews

Hancock Park contains a community of Orthodox Jews. According to Teresa Watanabe of the Los Angeles Times, there are no clear figures but in the early 21st century The Jewish Journal of Greater Los Angeles estimated that Orthodox Jews made up 20% of the neighborhood's total population. Hancock Park is home to nearly all subsections of Orthodox Judaism; of particular note is the large population of Chasidic Jews. The Chasidic Jewish population is growing at an above-average rate due to high birth rates within the community. Orthodox Jews are required to be within walking distance to their synagogues, and Hancock Park is within walking distance to the La Brea Avenue–area synagogues. Teresa Watanabe stated some Orthodox families cited the large size of houses as a reason for moving there, others cited a better housing value compared to Beverly Hills, and other cited a proximity to the Yavneh Hebrew Academy.  there were six Jews on the 16-member board of directors of the Hancock Park Homeowners Association. , the number of Orthodox Jews in Hancock Park is increasing. As of that year, there had been disputes between Orthodox Jews and their neighbors.

Education

LAUSD operates the public schools within the Hancock Park borders.

 Third Street Elementary School, 201 South June Street
 John Burroughs Middle School, 600 South McCadden Place
 Marlborough School, private school for young women established in 1889, 250 South Rossmore Avenue

Consuls general
 The Consulate General of Belize is located at 4801 Wilshire Blvd, Suite 250.

Additionally, many residences of consuls general are within Hancock Park.

 Official Residence of the Consul General of Argentina - 403 S. Plymouth Boulevard.
 Official Residence of the British Consul General - 450 S. June Street. Since 1957, the residence of the British Consul General in Los Angeles has been in a home designed by the renowned architect Wallace Neff and completed in 1928.  Prince William, Duke of Cambridge, and Catherine, Duchess of Cambridge, stayed there in July 2011 on their first visit to the United States after their wedding. 
 Official Residence of the Consul General of Canada - 165 S Muirfield Road.
 Official Residence of the Consul General of Japan - Hudson Avenue.  On May 21, 2019, the Government of Japan  presented Dr. Henry H. Takei the Order of the Rising Sun at the Hancock Park home of the Consul General.

In popular culture
 172 S. McCadden Place - the home of "Baby Jane" Hudson in Whatever Happened to Baby Jane.  According to Variety, "its appearance in “What Ever Happened to Baby Jane?” has secured its place in the annals of Hollywood history".

Notable people
 Muhammad Ali, boxer
 Mara Brock Akil & Salim Akil
 Antonio Banderas
 Stacey Bendet, fashion designer
 Nat King Cole, singer and first black resident
 Natalie Cole, singer
 Jan Crull Jr.
 Eric Eisner, producer
 Bruce Feirstein, writer
 Jake Gyllenhaal, actor
 Melanie Griffith
 Leonard Hill, television executive and real estate developer
 Lewis Stone
Mike Murphy
 Ozzy Osbourne
 Lou Rawls, singer
 Tavis Smiley, talk show host

See also 

 List of districts and neighborhoods in Los Angeles

References

External links

 Windsor Square, Hancock Park Historical Society
 Los Angeles Times profile of Hancock Park
 Hancock Park crime map and statistics
 Burroughs Middle School
 Third Street Elementary School

 
Neighborhoods in Los Angeles
Central Los Angeles